This is a list of airports in Sicily, grouped by type and sorted by location.

On the island of Sicily there are six main airports and several smaller airfields catering to general aviation. There are also two small airports on the Sicilian islands of Lampedusa and Pantelleria. In 2011 the airports of Sicily collectively handled 13,257,369 passengers.

History 
The first airfield to open on the island was Catania Airport in May 1924 followed by Palermo–Boccadifalco Airport that was opened on 28 June 1931. In the 1930s, during the Italian fascist era, several airfields such as Trapani–Milo Airport (1936), Comiso Airport (1937), Pantelleria Airport (1938) and Ponte Olivo Airfield were built to control the Mediterranean Sea but during World War II all airfields on the islands were heavily bombarded by the British Royal Air Force based on Malta. The construction of Trapani–Chinisia Airfield was completed in 1949 and Trapani–Milo Airport was closed. In 1959 the American military took over the old airfield at Sigonella that had been abandoned since the end of the war. During the 1950s, Palermo's airport was the third-busiest airport by volume of traffic in Italy and construction for a bigger airport began. The new Palermo–Punta Raisi Airport opened in 1960. In 1961, with the completion of Trapani–Birgi Airport commercial flights were moved to the new airport leaving only military activity at Trapani–Chinisia, which eventually closed altogether in 1970. In 1968 Lampedusa Airport was completed.

Airports 

Many of the closed and some of the active airports were originally opened before IATA and ICAO codes were used but each Italian airport had an ID number used by the Italian Regia Aeronautica to codify the airfield.

Active airports 

Airport names shown in bold have scheduled passenger service on commercial airlines.

Former airports

Former water aerodromes 
During the 1920s and 1930s flights were operated from the Sicilian water aerodromes of Siracusa and Marsala to the cities of Rome and Naples on the Italian mainland and to the cities of Tripoli and Benghazi in Libya, using seaplanes and amphibious aircraft. There was also a postal service from Palermo's harbour there to Naples and a passenger-service on the route Rome–Palermo–Tunis. Enna–Nicoletti Water Aerodrome, located on a lake in central Sicily, was opened in 2007 and closed the following year.

Notes

Airports in Sicily